Stillingia treculiana, Trecul's toothleaf, is a species of flowering plant in the family Euphorbiaceae. It was originally described as Gymnanthes treculiana Müll.Arg. in 1865. It is native to southern Texas in the United States and northeast Mexico, growing in sandy and gravelly soils in dry habitats.

References

treculiana
Plants described in 1865
Flora of Texas
Flora of Mexico